Larkhall railway station serves the town of Larkhall, South Lanarkshire, Scotland.

History 

The station was originally opened as Larkhall Central on 1 July 1905 by the Caledonian Railway as part of their Mid Lanark Lines which filled in various gaps around Larkhall, Stonehouse, Strathaven and Blackwood. It closed to passengers on 4 October 1965.

Re-opening 
Forty years after closure, the station was officially reopened on 9 December 2005 by Jack McConnell MSP, the then First Minister for Scotland. Passenger services started on 12 December 2005, with trains serving the Argyle Line.

Future improvements 

In March 2007, there was speculation that the line may be extended beyond Larkhall station, to stations in Stonehouse and Strathaven.

Strathclyde Partnership for Transport are expected to fund a feasibility study into reopening the section of line to Stonehouse at some time in 2008.

Services 
As of May 2016, they run to  instead, but southbound arrivals still originate from Dalmuir.

An hourly Sunday service started from December 2007 on a one-year trial basis. This trial has been successful, and the hourly Sunday service is now a permanent feature. It runs to  via Clydebank.

Argyle Line services are currently operated by Class 318s and Class 320s.

References

External links 

 Larkhall to Milngavie rail link - Scottish Executive 2003
 New Link for Larkhall opens - BBC News Scotland website
 RAILSCOT on the Larkhall re-opening - for history and pictures of the station and line.
 RAILSCOT on the Mid Lanark Lines

Railway stations in South Lanarkshire
Former Caledonian Railway stations
Railway stations in Great Britain opened in 1905
Railway stations in Great Britain closed in 1965
Railway stations in Great Britain opened in 2005
Reopened railway stations in Great Britain
SPT railway stations
Railway stations served by ScotRail
Beeching closures in Scotland
Larkhall